Eskişehirspor Women's Football is the women's football team of the Turkish multi-sport club of Eskişehirspor based in Eskişehir,

History

Eskişehirspor entered the national competition in the Turkish Women's Regional League's 2009–10 season playing in the Division 3. At the end of their second season in the Regional League, the team was promoted to the Turkish Women's Second League. The team finished the 2011–12 season in the Central Anatolia Division of the Second League as runners-up, and was promoted to the Turkish Women's First Football League. At the end of the 2012–13 season, Eskişehir women landed at the bottom of the team list, and was relegated to the Second League. The team was successful in the 2013–14 season, and finished the league as winner after winning the play-off matches. The team played the 2014–15 season again in the First League, and finished at 7th place.

Colors and badge
Eskişehirspor's colors are black, red and yellow. The club's badge features a yellow football with the red-colored letter "E" for the hometown "Eskişehir" and the black-colored letter "S" for "Spor" flanking the main club's foundation year of 1965.

Stadium
The team play their home matches at the Vali Hanefi Demirkol Stadium.

Statistics
.

Current squad
.

Head coach:  Ali Ersoy

Honours
Turkish Women's Second Football League
 Winners (1): 2013–14
 Runners-up (1):  2011–12

References

External links

Women's football clubs in Turkey
Association football clubs established in 2009
2009 establishments in Turkey
Eskişehirspor